Norway competed at the 1976 Winter Paralympics in Örnsköldsvik, Sweden. 23 competitors from Norway won 12 medals including 7 gold, 3 silver and 2 bronze and finished 4th in the medal table. Norway competed both in alpine skiing and cross-country skiing. All medals were won in cross-country skiing.

Alpine skiing 

Two athletes represented Norway in alpine skiing: Per Christian Blomquist and Finn Soerensen.

Blomquist competed in the Men's Giant Slalom I and Men's Slalom I events. He finished in 9th and 14th place respectively.

Soerensen competed in the Men's Alpine Combination II, Men's Giant Slalom II and Men's Slalom II events.

Cross-country 

The medalists are:

  Jarle Johnsen Men's Middle Distance 15 km A
  Terje Hansen, Jarle Johnsen, Morten Langeroed Men's 3x10 km Relay A-B
  Reidun Laengen Women's Middle Distance 10 km B
  Morten Langeroed Men's Middle Distance 15 km B
  Morten Langeroed Men's Short Distance 10 km B
  Vigdis Bente Mordre Women's Middle Distance 10 km I
  Vigdis Bente Mordre Women's Short Distance 5 km I
  Aud Berntsen, Aud Grundvik, Reidun Laengen Women's 3x5 km Relay A-B
  Reidun Laengen Women's Short Distance 5 km B
  Jarle Johnsen Men's Short Distance 10 km A
  Terje Hansen Men's Middle Distance 15 km B
  Terje Hansen Men's Short Distance 10 km B

See also 

 Norway at the Paralympics
 Norway at the 1976 Winter Olympics

References 

Norway at the Paralympics
1976 in Norwegian sport
Nations at the 1976 Winter Paralympics